Raijmel (Assamese:  (people), mel (meeting)) is a people's meeting in Assam, an old political and social institution that originated in medieval times. Since these meetings could encompass more than one village, they were politically more potent than the village  panchayat. Raijmels played an important role in peasant organization and uprisings in colonial Assam, especially during the uprisings at Phulaguri (1861),Rangia(1893-94),Lachima(1894) and Patharughat (1894).

Notes

References

 

History of Assam